The United States Senate Committee on the District of Columbia was one of the first standing committees created in the United States Senate, in 1816. It had jurisdiction over the District of Columbia. It continued to exist until the reorganization of 1977 when, following the granting of home rule to the district, its duties were transferred to the Committee on Governmental Affairs.

Committee chairmen

External links
Chairmen of Senate Standing Committees: 1789-Present

District of Columbia
1816 establishments in the United States
1977 disestablishments in Washington, D.C.
History of Washington, D.C.